is a passenger railway station located in the city of Himeji, Hyōgo Prefecture, Japan, operated by the private Sanyo Electric Railway.

Lines

Station layout
The station consists of two unnumbered ground-level side platforms connected by a level crossing. The station is unattended.

Platforms

Adjacent stations

|-
!colspan=5|Sanyo Electric Railway

History
Tegara Station opened on August 19, 1923. The station was closed July 20, 1945 and reopened on August 1, 1958.

Passenger statistics
In fiscal 2018, the station was used by an average of 1047 passengers daily (boarding passengers only).

Surrounding area
 Senba River
Tegarayama Central Park
Himeji City Himeji Stadium
Himeji City Athletics Stadium
Himeji City Central Gymnasium
Hyogo Prefectural Budokan

See also
List of railway stations in Japan

References

External links

 Official website (Sanyo Electric Railway) 

Railway stations in Japan opened in 1923
Railway stations in Himeji